Enrique Díaz may refer to:

 Enrique Díaz (sailor) (born 1957), Puerto Rican sailor
 Enrique Díaz (footballer, born 1959), Costa Rican football winger
 Enrique Díaz (footballer, born 1982), Uruguayan football centre-back